Mental Health, Religion and Culture is an interdisciplinary peer-reviewed academic journal published by Routledge. It publishes original articles that deal with mental health in relation to religion and spirituality. The journal was established in 1998. The journal is abstracted and indexed by Scopus, Caredata, CINAHL, CommunityWISE, Family Studies Database, PsycINFO, Theology Digest, Sociological Abstracts, Social Care Institute for Excellence, and Religious and Theological Abstracts.

References

External links 
 

Publications established in 1998
Religious studies journals
Psychiatry journals
Psychology of religion journals
Taylor & Francis academic journals
Psychotherapy journals
Religion and mental health